Space Pirates is a British 2007 children's television series originally shown on CBeebies. It uses a mixture of live action and animation, set aboard a spaceship called "Guisto" which orbits Earth. It starred Luke Toulson as Captain DJ, and featured the voice of (then) Radio 1 newsreader Dominic Byrne as an alien news/weather/travel reporter called Zorst. There are 30 half-hour episodes which were first shown from 3 November 2007 until 22 March 2008.

Background
Space Pirates was commissioned for the BBC's CBeebies channel. The show is now designed to reach all ages and "bring the whole family together to explore a diverse range of musical performances." According to the BBC, for 6 weeks from 9 November 2007, viewers could press the red button on their TV remote controls and choose which of the three songs they wanted to listen to at the very end of the show. The show has also featured on the CBeebies slot on BBC Radio 7.

In 2008, the episode "Music to Paint to" was nominated for a Banff World Television Award. The show was also nominated for Best Pre-School Live Action Series at the 2008 BAFTA Children's Awards.

Storyline 
The space ship Guisto is led by Captain DJ, (played by Luke Toulson) who is very vain and stupid. It just orbits planet Earth searching for music for the radio show, Guisto Radio.  The tenuous storyline in every episode usually involves two space-wise kids, called Honk and Tonk, who are played by children. They trick Captain DJ and/or Lippy by selling him something worthless for lots of doubloons or junk food. Lippy is an anthropomorphised hypoallergenic microphone who often makes fun of Captain DJ. Captain DJ's real name is occasionally revealed (as "Leslie"). Also featured is a newsreader/weather forecaster/traffic reporter called Zorst, who is a green barnacle who clings to the stern of the ship (near the exhaust, hence his name). He always ends his reports with bad jokes. There are always 3 musical acts per episode, one either performed live on set (or specially recorded), one pop-video, and one cover song by three puppet rats called The Jingles - Windy, Stringy and Brassy. A group of children on Earth, called the Pirate Posse, get to vote on which song was the best and who they want to hear again, which always plays out the show.

Music 
The theme tune to the series, written by Darren Loveday and former Busted keyboardist Chris Banks, was released as a single available for download on iTunes, Chris Moyles popularised the song by playing it on his radio show, hoping to get it into the UK charts and beat The X Factor Christmas single ("When You Believe" by Leon Jackson). The result of Moyles' campaign was that the song completely failed to have any impact on the UK Singles Chart, although the song did spend eleven weeks at position number one on the iTunes Children's Chart. Moyles later played a mashup of the song that mixed it with the theme tune from Ghostbusters, the irony being that the mashup was actually created by Chris Banks himself.

Acts which appear on the show include: The Ebony Steel Band, McFly, The Cheeky Girls, Jamelia, The Drifters, The Puppini Sisters, Julie Felix, the London Community Gospel Choir, and The Ukulele Orchestra of Great Britain.

Cast 

Captain DJ (aka 'Leslie'): Luke Toulson
Lippy the Microphone: Adam Carter
Honk the Girl: Kirsty Rider
Tonk the Boy: Connor Panayi
The Jingles:
Stringy: Brian Herring
Brassy: Sarah Burgess
Windy: Dave Chapman
Zorst the Barnacle: Dominic Byrne
The Jolly Rogers: Stephen Cannon
Assistant Puppeteers: William Banyard, Yvonne Stone, Warrick Brownlow-Pike

Episodes

References

External links
Official Space Pirates website on CBeebies.
 

BBC children's television shows
British science fiction television shows
Television series by BBC Studios
Television series about pirates